Mr. Nobody (Eric Morden) is a supervillain appearing in American comic books published by DC Comics. He is the founder of the Brotherhood of Dada and an enemy of the Doom Patrol. Introduced as Morden in Doom Patrol #86 (March 1964), the character was re-envisioned as Mr. Nobody for Doom Patrol vol. 2 #26 (September 1989).

Mr. Nobody made his first live adaptation and was part of the main cast of the first season of the Doom Patrol television series on DC Universe, portrayed by Alan Tudyk.

Fictional character biography
Mr. Nobody's real name is Eric Morden. He appeared in one issue of the original series (Doom Patrol #86) as a member of the Brotherhood of Evil. In this appearance, he steals Rog, a robot designed by the Chief for lunar exploration.

When Grant Morrison reintroduced Morden in Doom Patrol vol. 2 #26, he provided a back story to explain Morden's absence. Former Brotherhood of Evil teammates the Brain and Monsieur Mallah had promised to kill Morden if he appears again, so he hid for many years in Paraguay. Still longing to be a part of society again, he undergoes experiments by an ex-Nazi scientist that grants him the ability to drain the sanity from human beings. However, he himself is driven insane, and forms the Brotherhood of Dada instead. He now looks like a two-dimensional artistic representation of a shadow and has an empty space on his chest in the shape of a heart.

Mr. Nobody recruits several bizarrely-powered individuals to form the first Brotherhood of Dada: Sleepwalk, who has vast strength only when sleepwalking; Frenzy, a large, garishly-dressed dyslexic Jamaican man who can transform into a whirling cyclone; Fog, who can absorb humans into his being when in his gaseous form; and the Quiz, a Japanese woman with "every super-power you've never thought of". The Brotherhood steals a psychoactive painting and uses it to absorb the city of Paris, France, along with several members of the Doom Patrol. They also unwittingly unleash "the fifth Horseman of the Apocalypse" from the painting. They are forced to help the Doom Patrol stop it, and DP member Crazy Jane harnesses the power of the painting to transform the Horseman into a hobby-horse, releasing her teammates and the city of Paris and trapping Mr. Nobody and his Brotherhood within the painting.

Later, Mr. Nobody escapes from the painting with the help of four members of his new Brotherhood of Dada, Agent "!", Alias the Blur, the Love Glove, and Number None. They steal the bicycle of Albert Hofmann, and use its lysergic resonance to power Mr. Nobody's presidential campaign. The US Government, unwilling to let Mr. Nobody become president, sends a super-powered agent after him: John Dandy, a man whose face is blank but has six other faces floating around him. Dandy kills almost every member of the Brotherhood, including Mr. Nobody. He throws one of his faces at Nobody, rendering the latter powerless and defenseless. Dandy then impales the now-human Mr. Nobody on a broken pole and removes what is revealed to be a mask. Cliff Steele attempts to place the semiconscious Mr. Nobody back inside the painting but it was apparently destroyed by gunfire from government agents before Steele could do so. Mr. Nobody then seems to disintegrate.

Mr. Nobody returns, this time white instead of black and with the ability to possess others. He now calls himself Mr. Somebody. He inhabits the body of billionaire Thayer Jost and controls MSE (short for "Mister Somebody Enterprises") for his own mysterious goals. Through MSE, he has leveled Danny the Street into Danny the Brick with his multidimensional gentrifiers and created the Front Men, his own team of metahumans with the public goal of being a police to the superhuman community. He manipulates the press and public, making them appear to be heroes who are under attack by the rogue Doom Patrol. He travels to Oolong Island where he takes control of Veronica Cale to further his goals. He nearly defeats the Doom Patrol, but is stopped by Ambush Bug who reveals to him that the title is about to be cancelled, and the universe will soon be rebooting anyway. Mr. Nobody abruptly vacates Cale's body and vanishes. However, it is also shown Mr. Somebody abducted Niles Caulder as a new host.

As part of the Young Animal imprint, Mr. Nobody reappears, without Caulder, with a plan to destroy reality and assembles a new group called the Brotherhood of Nada. He sells a foodstuff called $#!+ which, when triggered using his daughter Terry None, can destroy reality. Mr. Nobody, along with the Doom Patrol and Brotherhood of Nada, end up outside of reality at a location called Outer Heaven. There, he is chosen to be never ending entertainment for Eonymous, universe-destroying gods who could only be distracted with entertainment. He happily chooses to stay, and forces Terry to stay with him as well.

Powers and abilities
As a normal person, Eric Morden was a scientist who created a giant robot "Rog", which he offered to the Brotherhood of Evil in exchange for membership.

Once transformed into Mr. Nobody, Morden gained ambiguous Godlike powers at the cost of his humanity and sanity. Rejecting science, Morden could now warp reality, possess people, and teleport seamlessly through time and space.

In the Doom Patrol TV series, Mr. Nobody possesses omniscience, allowing him to view and interact with the past, present, and future at will. He appears to know he is in a TV series. He also possesses psychic powers: using these powers, he's able to create lifelike illusions which he uses to torment others and to drive them irrevocably insane (as he did Lodestone, Celsius and Mento). He also can use his power to alter the past; communicating with Crazy Jane to prevent her from killing her psychiatrist and instead making one of her personalities (that can control minds) form a cult to create a cosmic horror entity by belief/worship to fight another cosmic horror entity. Mr. Nobody, in the TV show, also can warp reality, turning humans into piñatas and creating monstrosities known as "the Vinyl Men" as henchmen. He can also drive people into a homicidal frenzy through sound, as he used the music of Perry Como to drive innocent people irrevocably insane and create miniature pocket universes, where he can hide people from others.

In the comic, Morden can not change back and forth from his normal form and his human form. During his second encounter with the Doom Patrol as Mr. Nobody, a weakness was revealed relating to canceling out his power. Being hooded or masked can cause Morden to revert to normal human form (where he was portrayed as naked save for the gloves he wore as Mr. Nobody). Removing the mask caused Morden to turn back into Mr. Nobody; while masked, Morden was horrified at what he became, as his sanity also returned and begged the Doom Patrol to not let him revert to Mr. Nobody. However, one of the Brotherhood of Dada removed the mask from Morden's face and he returned to his insane inhuman form. This is inverted in the Doom Patrol TV adaptation; Mr. Morden can turn from human to his Mr. Nobody form at will, nor does he have a weakness where he can be stripped of his power.

In other media
 Eric Morden appears in the "Doom Patrol" segments of DC Nation Shorts, voiced by Jeffrey Combs.
 Mr. Nobody appears in season one of the Doom Patrol television series, portrayed by Alan Tudyk. This version was a low level criminal in the Brotherhood of Evil during the 1940s until he was replaced by Monsieur Mallah, causing him to lose his girlfriend Millie in the process. Wanting to be more than a "nobody", Morden traveled to Paraguay to undergo an experimental procedure meant to grant him metahuman powers. Niles Caulder attempted to halt the experiment, but Morden gains near-omnipotence, reality alteration, the ability to create small pocket universes, and the ability to break the fourth wall. Maintaining some sense of his original self, Morden uses his powers to drive others insane over the decades. Additionally, he serves as narrator for the Doom Patrol's adventures. After kidnapping Caulder, Dorothy Spinner, and Danny the Street and trapping them in a painting called the "White Space", the Doom Patrol attempt to save them, but Spinner enlarges Ezekiel the Cockroach, who forces Morden out and goes on a rampage until the Doom Patrol allow Ezekiel to devour them so they would be protected while Negative Man unleashes a blast that kills Ezekiel and traps Morden in the painting. As of season two, Morden disappeared after he "landed an animated gig".

References

External links
 Mr. Nobody at the Unofficial Guide to the DC Universe

Comics characters introduced in 1964
Doom Patrol
Comics characters introduced in 1989
DC Comics supervillains
DC Comics male supervillains
DC Comics metahumans
DC Comics characters who can teleport
DC Comics characters who have mental powers 
DC Comics telekinetics 
DC Comics telepaths
Fictional characters who can manipulate reality
Fictional characters who can manipulate time
Fictional characters with immortality
Fictional characters with spirit possession or body swapping abilities
Characters created by Grant Morrison
Characters created by Arnold Drake